Kiss of the Spider Woman may refer to:

Kiss of the Spider Woman (novel), (Spanish: El beso de la mujer araña) the 1976 novel by the Argentine writer Manuel Puig
 Kiss of the Spider Woman (play), the 1983 stage play Puig adapted from his novel
Kiss of the Spider Woman (film), (Portuguese: O beijo da mulher-aranha) the 1985 film adaptation of the novel directed by Héctor Babenco
Kiss of the Spider Woman (musical), the 1993 Broadway musical written by John Kander and Fred Ebb, also based on the novel
 Chapter Seven: Kiss of the Spider Woman, a 2020 episode of the television series Katy Keene